Pelemiši is a village in the municipalities of Šekovići, Republika Srpska and Kladanj, Bosnia and Herzegovina.

Demographics 
According to the 2013 census, its population was nil, down from 101 Serbs living in the Šekovići part in 1991.

References

Populated places in Kladanj
Populated places in Šekovići